The Pequot Library is an association library in Southport, Connecticut. It was founded in 1887, and opened in 1894. The library has a circulating collection of over 116,000 books, audiobooks, and DVDs.

The library takes its name from a vanquished Pequot group of 80 to 100 who had earlier fled their home territory in the Mystic area and taken refuge with approximately 200 Sasqua people who inhabited the area that is now Fairfield.

Founding
The Pequot Library was founded by Virginia Marquand Monroe (of the Marquand & Co. family) and Elbert B. Monroe as a memorial to Virginia's uncle and adoptive father, Frederick Marquand. Marquand lived for 50 years in a Greek Revival house on Pequot Avenue, which was razed in 1892 to reveal that a new library building that had been built in secret  on the land behind it. The library was in its early years a women-led institution but had an ambiguous relationship to the then-current suffrage movement.

Community libraries, in the form of book collections and associations of dues-paying members, were common, but often only lasted until the members had read all the books, though with a different model that has contributed to its endurance. Through the generosity of donors and support from the Town of Fairfield, Pequot Library is able to offer its programming and resources "free as air to all" in the words of its founders, as an association library that is privately-owned by the Pequot Library Association but functions as a public-serving library.

Architecture 
The Richardsonian Romanesque building that houses the library was designed by the architect Robert Henderson Robertson and is a contributing property to the National Register of Historic Places' Southport Historic District. 

By the time Virginia Marquand Monroe was contemplating her library, the architect-client relationship was no longer so client-centered, and Robertson was the creative force behind the design, influenced by Henry Hobson Richardson. The library's pink granite exterior and red tile roof make a contrast with the surrounding clapboard architecture.

In 2006, the Pequot Library invested in a restoration project to address the condition of the elaborate metalwork set throughout their library stacks. Robert Robertson designed each shelf in the library to be supported by cast iron structures. Each row of shelving is framed by columns and the stairways linking the two storeys are made with balusters of garlands and vines in copper plated cast iron. During the course of restoration, over 6,000 metal pieces were individually treated. The project was carried out by Howard Newman's restoration company Newmans’ Ltd.

The most recent restoration of the Library which occurred in 2020 and 2021, when the original signature terra cotta roof tiles from 1894 had replacements installed from the original manufacturer, Ludowici Roof Tile. The project included structural repairs and waterproofing the entire original structure and was funded to the amount of $1.6 million by the community and several grants.

Special collections
 

The library has a large Special Collection of manuscripts, rare books, and archives. The permanent Special Collection includes historically significant early American manuscripts, archives, rare books, artifacts, artwork, maps, and photographs. In total, the Special Collections house more than 30,000 items, many there since the library opened in 1894. Most items are available for view by appointment only with staff supervision in the Dillon Reading room of the library. The Pequot library founders built the original collection to document early Americana related to the thirteen original colonies, but it has since been expanded to include early printed books, medieval manuscripts, Shakespeareana, and information from American publishing in the twentieth century. Highlights include a 1776 Norwich edition of Common Sense, sermons, and other theological works from the seventeenth to nineteenth centuries, material on Native Americans from the seventeenth to nineteenth centuries, and first editions of Louisa May Alcott’s works, and Kate Greenaway editions. 

A highlight in the library's Special Collection is The Birds of America Volume 2, an oversized book (2.3 by 3.4 feet) that includes a collection of full color drawings by John James Audubon that his youngest son, John Woodhouse Audubon, re-issued in 1858. The prints were reproduced via chromolithography performed by Julius Bien of New York, who was a pioneer in the technique. The volume is also known as the "Bien Edition." The pages are turned to display a new print page monthly. It is on public display in the library main reading room.

Of the approximately 30,000 items in the  Collections, 1,800 items are held on long-term loan at the Beinecke Rare Book & Manuscript Library at Yale University as the Monroe, Wakeman, and Holman Collection. That Collection includes the first printed cookbook, De Honesta Voluptate et Valetudine,by Bartholomaeus Platina (1475); autographs of all American Presidents and the cosigners of the Declaration of Independence, including the rare Button Gwinnett autograph. It also includes much of the material associated with Joel Barlow. Among the titles in the Special Collections are Epistola de insulis nuper inventis by Christopher Columbus, translated into Latin by Leandro di Cosco and printed in 1493; two of the three contemporaneous histories of the Pequot War in New England; the Saybrook Platform which was the first book published in Connecticut in 1710. Also included in the collection is Phillis Wheatley's Poems on Various Subjects, Religious and Moral from 1786. 

Another collection includes the typescript of the last four chapters of Margaret Mitchell's Gone With the Wind.

Community events

The library accepts used book donations and hosts a large used book sale every year, the largest in Connecticut. Attracting around 8,000 people, it  is the library’s largest special event, raising a significant percentage of the library’s operating budget. The sale generally has more than 60 different categories of books and media. There are also hundreds of CDs, DVDs, records and tapes. In 2007, the annual summer book sale featured more than 140,000 volumes.

References

1887 establishments in Connecticut
Library buildings completed in 1894
Fairfield, Connecticut
Libraries in Fairfield County, Connecticut